The following list contains scores or songs which are the primary theme music of a television series or miniseries.

 They are sorted alphabetically by the television series' title. Any themes, scores, or songs which are billed under a different name than their respective television series' title are shown in parentheses, except in cases where they are officially billed as "Theme from [Series' Name]", "[Series' Name] Theme", etc., which are omitted. This list does not include television series whose broadcast run was less than ten episodes (i.e. a "failed" series) unless officially designated as a television miniseries. In cases where more than one piece of music was used for the main theme during the broadcast run of a television series (Baywatch, Happy Days, Starsky & Hutch, etc.), only the most widely recognized score is listed.

0 - 9
100 Things To Do Before High School ("Brand New Day") - Isabela Moner
12 O'Clock High - Dominic Frontiere
2 Broke Girls ("Second Chance") - Peter Bjorn and John
2Point4Children - Howard Goodall
2000 Malibu Road - James Newton Howard
21 Jump Street - composed by Liam Sternberg; performed by Holly Robinson
227 ("There's No Place Like Home") - Ray Colcord, performed by Marla Gibbs
24 - Sean Callery
240-Robert - Mike Post and Pete Carpenter
3-2-1 Contact - Tom Anthony
3-2-1 Penguins! ("3-2-1 Penguins! Theme Song") - Kurt Heinecke
30 Rock - Jeff Richmond
The 4400 ("A Place In Time") - Amanda Abizaid
48 Hours - Edd Kalehoff
500 Questions - Burnett Music Group
6teen - Don Breithaupt
The 7D - Parry Gripp
7th Heaven - Steve Plunkett
77 Sunset Strip - Mack David and Jerry Livingston
8 Simple Rules - Dan Foliart
9 to 5 ("9 to 5 (Dolly Parton song)") - Phoebe Snow (1982–83); Dolly Parton (1986–88)

A - B
A Laurel & Hardy Cartoon - Ted Nichols
The A-Team - Mike Post and Pete Carpenter
Absolutely Fabulous ("This Wheel's on Fire") - Bob Dylan and Rick Danko (performed by Julie Driscoll, Ade Edmondson and Debbie Harry)
Adam-12 - Frank Comstock
Accidental Family - Earle Hagen
Action ("Even a Dog Can Shake Hands") - Warren Zevon
Adam's Rib ("Two People") - Perry Botkin Jr. and Gil Garfield
The Addams Family ("The Addams Family Theme") - Vic Mizzy
The Adventurer - John Barry
The Adventures of Black Beauty ("Galloping Home") - Denis King
The Adventures of Brisco County Jr. - Randy Edelman
Adventures of the Gummi Bears ("Gummi Bears Theme") - Michael and Patty Silversher
The Adventures of Jimmy Neutron: Boy Genius - Bowling for Soup
The Adventures of Pete & Pete ("Hey Sandy") - Polaris
The Adventures of Rin Tin Tin - Stanley Keyana
Adventures of Superman - Leon Klatzkin
The Adventures of William Tell - Gioachino Rossini, lyrics were added by Harold Purcell and were sung by David Whitfield.
Adventure Time ("Island Song") - Ashley Eriksson
A.E.S. Hudson Street - Jack Elliott and Allyn Ferguson
Agony ("Dear Jane") - Graham Field, performed by Babs Fletcher
After Henry ("Three Quarter Blues) - George Gershwin
Airwolf - Sylvester Levay
AKBingo! (Aitakatta) - Yasushi Akimoto & Bounceback; Performed by AKB48
ALF - Alf Clausen and Tom Kramer
Alfred Hitchcock Presents ("Funeral March of a Marionette") - Charles Gounod
Alias Smith and Jones - Billy Goldenberg
Alice ("There's a New Girl in Town") - (music by David Shire) (lyrics by Alan and Marilyn Bergman) (sung by Linda Lavin)
Alien Nation - Kenneth Johnson and David Kurtz
Aliens in the Family - Todd Rundgren
All Creatures Great and Small - ("Piano Parchment") by Johnny Pearson
All Grown Up! ("All Grown Up with You") - Cree Summer
All in Good Faith - Ronnie Hazlehurst
All in the Family ("Those Were the Days") - 
Alfresco - David McNiven
'Allo, 'Allo! - David Croft and Roy Moore
All at No. 20 - Denis King
All That - TLC
All That Glitters ("Genesis") - Kenny Rankin
Allsång på Skansen (Sing-along at Skansen, Sveriges Television) ("Stockholm i mitt hjärta" translation: "Stockholm In My Heart") - Lasse Berghagen
Ally McBeal ("Searchin' My Soul") - Vonda Shepard
Almost Home - Jennifer Warnes and Joey Scarbury
Aloha Paradise - Steve Lawrence
Alvin and the Chipmunks ("We're The Chipmunks") - Ross Bagdasarian and Janice Karman
Alvinnn!!! and the Chipmunks ("We're the Chipmunks") - Ross Bagdasarian and Janice Karman
The Alvin Show - Ross Bagdasarian, Neal Hefti and Carl W. Stalling
The Amazing Chan and the Chan Clan - Hoyt Curtin
The Amazing Race - John M. Keane
The Amazing Spider-Man - Stu Phillips
Amazing Stories - John Williams
The Amazing World of Gumball - Ben Locket
Amen ("Shine On Me") - composed by Andraé Crouch; sung by Vanessa Bell Armstrong
America's Funniest Home Videos ("The Funny Things You Do") - Jill Colucci
American Bandstand ("Bandstand Boogie") - Charles Albertine (alt. version with lyrics by Barry Manilow and Bruce Sussman)
American Dad ("Good Morning USA") - Walter Murphy; performed by Seth MacFarlane
American Dreams ("Generation") - Emerson Hart
Amphibia ("Welcome to Amphibia (instrumental)") - Doug Petty
Andi Mack ("Tomorrow Starts Today") - Sabrina Carpenter
The Andy Griffith Show ("The Fishin' Hole") - Earle Hagen and Herbert W. Spencer (performed by Andy Griffith)
Anne with an E ("Ahead by a Century") - The Tragically Hip
Angel ("Catharsis of Sufferance") - Darling Violetta
Angie ("Different Worlds") - Charles Fox and Norman Gimbel (sung by Maureen McGovern)
Animaniacs - Richard Stone and Tom Ruegger (sung by Rob Paulsen, Jess Harnell and Tress MacNeille)
Ann Jillian - Ann Jillian and Stan Harris
Another Day ("Just Another Day") - Paul Wiiliams
Another World ("Another World") - Crystal Gayle and Gary Morris (1987-1996)
The Ant and the Aardvark - Doug Goodwin
A.N.T. Farm ("Exceptional") - China Anne McClain
Apple's Way - Morton Stevens
Archie Bunker's Place 
The Archie Show ("Sugar, Sugar") - Jeff Barry and Andy Kim (performed by The Archies)
Are You Being Served? - David Croft and Ronnie Hazlehurst, performed by Stephanie Gathercole
Arthur  ("Believe it Yourself") - Ziggy Marley and the Melody Makers
As the Bell Rings ("Shadow") - Demi Lovato and Tony Oller
As Time Goes By - Joe Fagin
As Told by Ginger ("I'm In Between") - Macy Gray
Ask the Family ("Acka Raga") - Joe Harriott and John Mayer
The Associates ("Wall Street Blues") - B.B. King
Atomic Betty - Tajja Isen
A Touch of Frost - Barbara Thompson and John Hiseman
Auf Wiedersehen, Pet 
Austin & Ally ("Can't Do It Without You") - Ross Lynch (seasons 1–3) and Laura Marano (season 4)
Austin City Limits ("London Homesick Blues") - Gary P. Nunn
Automan - Billy Hinsche and Stu Phillips
A Very Peculiar Practice ("We Love You") - written by Dave Greenslade, performed by Elkie Brooks
The Avengers - John Dankworth (series 1, 2, 3) - Laurie Johnson (series 4, 5, 6)
B Positive - Keb Mo' and Chuck Lorre
Baa Baa Black Sheep - Mike Post and Pete Carpenter
Babes - Dan Foliart and Howard Pearl
Baby Blues ("It's All Been Done") - Barenaked Ladies
Babylon 5 - Christopher Franke
Bachelor Father 
Backstage ("Spark") - Stefanie McCarol
Bad Girls Club ("Love Me or Hate Me") - Lady Sovereign
Bagdad Cafe ("Calling You") - Jevetta Steele
Banacek - Billy Goldenberg
Bare Essence ("In Finding You I Found Love") - Sarah Vaughan
Barefoot in the Park - Darlene Love and The Blossoms
Baretta ("Keep Your Eye on the Sparrow") - Dave Grusin and Morgan Ames; Performed by Sammy Davis Jr.
The Barkleys - Doug Goodwin
Barnaby Jones - Jerry Goldsmith
Barney & Friends 
Barney Miller - Jack Elliott and Allyn Ferguson
The Baron - Edwin Astley
Bat Masterson - Bill Lee
Batman ("Batman Theme") - Neal Hefti
Battlestar Galactica - Glen A. Larson and Stu Phillips
Battlestar Galactica (2004) - Bear McCreary
Bay City Blues - Mike Post
Baywatch 
Baywatch Nights 
Bear in the Big Blue House - ("Welcome to the Blue House") - (Peter Lurye, performed by the cast), ("Goodbye Song") - (Peter Lurye, performed by Bear and Luna)
Beat Bugs ("All You Need Is Love") – John Lennon, Paul McCartney (composers)
Beauty and the Beast - Lee Holdridge
Beggar My Neighbour - Alan Roper
Bella and the Bulldogs (One of the Boys") - Brec Bassinger
Ben 10 - Moxy
The Benny Hill Show ("Yakety Sax") - Boots Randolph
Benson - George Tipton
The Berenstain Bears - Lee Ann Womack
Best Friends Whenever ("Whenever") - Forever in Your Mind
Best of the West - Rex Allen
The Beverly Hillbillies ("The Ballad of Jed Clampett") - Paul Henning (played by Lester Flatt & Earl Scruggs); sung by Jerry Scoggins
Beverly Hills, 90210 - John E. Davis
Bewitched - Howard Greenfield and Jack Keller
The Big Bang Theory - Barenaked Ladies
Big Blue - Timbaland
Big City Greens ("Big City Greens Main Title Theme") - The Mowgli's; ("Do it All Again") - The Houghton Brothers 
Big Love ("God Only Knows") - Brian Wilson and Tony Asher (performed by The Beach Boys)
The Big Valley - George Duning
The Bill Cosby Show ("Hikky Burr") - Quincy Jones and Bill Cosby
The Bill Dana Show ("Jose's Theme") - Earle Hagen
Billy ("You Could Be The Only One") - Ray Kennedy
Billy (1992) ("I've Told Every Little Star") - Sonny Rollins
The Bing Crosby Show 
The Bionic Woman - Jerry Fielding
Bizaardvark ("Let's Go Make Some Videos") - Olivia Rodrigo and Madison Hu
B. J. and the Bear ("B.J. McKay") - Greg Evigan
Blackadder - Howard Goodall
Black Books - Jonathan Whitehead
Black Saddle - Jerry Goldsmith and Arthur Morton
Blansky's Beauties ("I Want It All") - Cyndi Grecco 
Bleach - Orange Range
Bless This House - Geoff Love
Blondie - Will Hutchins and Patricia Harty
Blossom ("My Opinionation") - Dr. John
Blue Bloods ("Reagan's Theme") - Rob Simonsen
The Blue Knight ("Bumper's Theme") - Henry Mancini
Blue's Clues - ("Blue's Clues Theme") - Nick Balaban and Michael Rubin
Bluey - Joff Bush and David Barber
Boardwalk Empire ("Straight Up and Down") - The Brian Jonestown Massacre
Bob & Carol & Ted & Alice - Artie Butler
The Bob Hope Show ("Thanks for the Memory") - Leo Robin and Ralph Rainger
The Bob Newhart Show ("Home to Emily") - Lorenzo Music and Henrietta Music
Bob the Builder ("Can We Fix It?") - Paul K. Joyce
Bobby's World - John Tesh
The Bold and the Beautiful ("High Upon This Love") - Jack Alloco and David Kurtz; performed by Dionne Warwick
Bonanza - Jay Livingston and Ray Evans
Bones - The Crystal Method
Boon ("Hi Ho Silver") - Jim Diamond
Booker ("Hot in the City") - Billy Idol
Bosom Buddies ("My Life") - Billy Joel
Bosch ("Can't Let Go") - Caught A Ghost
Bottom ("BB's Blues") - B.B. King
Bourbon Street Beat - Mack David and Jerry Livingston
Boy Meets World - Ray Colcord (seasons 1–4); Phil Rosenthal (seasons 5–7)
Bracken's World - David Rose first season; ("Worlds") - The Lettermen (second season)
The Brady Bunch - Frank De Vol and Sherwood Schwartz (performed first season by Peppermint Trolley Company; seasons 2-5 by The Brady Bunch Kids)
Brand New Life - Jill Colucci
Branded - Dominic Frontiere and Alan Alch
Bratz ("Bratz TV Theme") - Lauren Evans
Bread - David Mackay
Breaking Point - David Raksin
Bret Maverick ("Maverick Didn't Come Here to Lose") - Ed Bruce
Bridget Loves Bernie - Jerry Fielding
Brooklyn Bridge ("Just Over the Brooklyn Bridge") - Art Garfunkel
Brotherly Love ("No Matter Where You Are") - Joey Lawrence
Brutally Normal ("Green Light") - Jeremy Toback
Brush Strokes ("Because of You") - Dexys Midnight Runners
Bubble Guppies - Terry Fryer
The Buccaneers - Edwin Astley
Buck Rogers in the 25th Century ("Suspension") - Kipp Lennon; composed by Glen A. Larson
Buffy the Vampire Slayer - Nerf Herder
The Bugs Bunny Show ("This Is It-The Bugs Bunny Overture") - Mack David and Jerry Livingston
The Bugaloos - lyrics by Norman Gimbel, composed by Charles Fox, performed by The Bugaloos cast
Bunk'd ("Kikiwaka") - Kevin Quinn
The Busy World of Richard Scarry - Milan Kymlicka
Butterflies ("Love is Like a Butterfly") - Dolly Parton (adapted by Ronnie Hazlehurst, performed by Clare Torry)
The Buzz on Maggie - ("Just the Way I Am") - Skye Sweetnam

C - D 
Cagney & Lacey - Bill Conti
Caillou ("I'm Caillou") - performed by the title character
California Dreams - 
California Fever - Jimmy McNichol
Camp Lazlo - Andy Paley and Terry Scott Taylor
Captain Nice - Vic Mizzy
Captain Scarlet and the Mysterons - The Spectrum
Car 54, Where Are You? - John Strauss and Nat Hiken
The Cara Williams Show ("Cara's Theme") - Kenyon Hopkins
Care Bears: Adventures in Care-a-lot ("We Are Care Bears") - Kay Hanley
Care Bears: Welcome to Care-a-Lot ("We'll Always be There!") - Richard Evans and Chip Whitewood
The Carol Burnett Show ("I'm So Glad We Had This Time Together") - Joe Hamilton
Casey, Crime Photographer - Morton Gould
Casper the Friendly Ghost - Winston Sharples
The Catherine Tate Show ("In These Shoes?") - Kirsty MacColl (Series 1), Howard Goodall (Series 2–3) 
ChalkZone - (“Rudy’s Got the Chalk”) Guy Moon, Thomas Chase and Steve Rucker
The Champions - Tony Hatch
Chance in a Million ("Taking a Chance on Love") - Vernon Duke, Ted Fetter and John La Touche, performed by The Ladybirds
Charles in Charge - David Kurtz, Michael Jacobs, and Al Burton; performed by Shandi Sinnamon
Charlie Hoover ("Wild Thing") - Chip Taylor
Charlie's Angels - Jack Elliott and Allyn Ferguson
Charmed ("How Soon Is Now?") - Love Spit Love
Chef! ("Serious Profession") - Omar Lye-Fook
Cheers ("Where Everybody Knows Your Name") - Judy Hart Angelo and Gary Portnoy
Cheyenne - William Lava and Stan Jones
Chicago Fire - Alti Örvarsson
Chicago Hope  ("Theme from Chicago Hope") - Mark Isham
Chicago Med - Alti Örvarsson
Chicago P.D. - Alti Örvarsson
The Chicken Squad - Renee Sands
Chico and the Man - José Feliciano
China Beach - ("Reflections") - The Supremes; closing theme by John Rubinstein
Chip 'n Dale: Rescue Rangers - Mark Mueller
CHiPs - John Carl Parker (season one; season two & onward theme arranged by Alan Silvestri; rejected, un-used theme by Mike Post)
Chopper One - Dominic Frontiere
Chuck ("Short Skirt/Long Jacket") - Cake
ChuckleVision -  Dave Cook
Cimarron Strip - Maurice Jarre
Circus Boy - Hal Hopper and Victor McLeod
Citizen Smith ("The Red Flag") by Jim Connell and Melchior Franck, ("The Glorious Day") composed by John Sullivan, performed by Robert Lindsay
City of Angels - Nelson Riddle
Clarissa Explains It All ("Way Cool") - Rachel Sweet
The Cleveland Show - Walter Murphy (vocal by Mike Henry)
The Clothes Show ("Opportunities (Let's Make Lots of Money)") - Pet Shop Boys
Clueless ("Ordinary Girl") - China Forbes
Coach - John Morris
Code Lyoko ("A World Without Danger") - Franck Keller and Ygal Amar
Code Monkeys ("Code Monkey") - Jonathan Coulton
The Colbert Report ("Baby Mumbles") - Cheap Trick
Colonel Humphrey Flack - Dave Kahn and Raoul Kraushaar
Colonel March of Scotland Yard - William Alwyn
Colt .45 - Hal Hopper
Columbo (Various Themes) - Billy Goldenberg, Gil Mellé, Dick DeBenedictis
Combat! - Leonard Rosenman
Coming of Age ("Sing, Sing, Sing") - Louis Prima
Community ("At Least It Was Here") - The 88
Condo ("Live and Love it Up") - Drake Frye
Coop & Cami Ask the World ("Ask the World") - Dakota Lotus and Ruby Rose Turner
Cop Rock ("Under the Gun") - Randy Newman
Cops ("Bad Boys") - Inner Circle
Corner Gas ("Not a Lot Going On") - Craig Northey and Jesse Valenzuela
Coronet Blue - Lenny Welch
Cory in the House - Kyle Massey and Maiara Walsh
The Cosby Mysteries - Craig Handy and David Weiss 
The Cosby Show ("Kiss Me") - Stu Gardner and Bill Cosby; (sung by Bobby McFerrin)
The Courtship of Eddie's Father ("Best Friend") - Harry Nilsson
Cover Up ("Holding Out for a Hero") - E. G. Daily
Cow and Chicken - Guy Moon
Cowboy Bebop ("Tank!" / "The Real Folk Blues") - Yoko Kanno, performed by Seatbelts
Cowboy in Africa - Malcolm Arnold
C.P.O. Sharkey - Peter Matz
Crime Story ("Runaway") - Del Shannon and Max Crook
Crocodile Shoes - Jimmy Nail
Crossing Jordan - Lisa Coleman and Wendy Melvoin
The Crown - Hans Zimmer
CSI: Crime Scene Investigation ("Who Are You") - Pete Townshend; performed by The Who
CSI: Cyber ("I Can See for Miles") - Pete Townshend; performed by The Who
CSI: Miami ("Won't Get Fooled Again") - Pete Townshend; performed by The Who
CSI: NY ("Baba O'Riley") - Pete Townshend; performed by The Who
Curb Your Enthusiasm - "Frolic" by Luciano Michelini
Curious George ("Like Curious George") - Dr. John
Dad's Army ("Who Do You Think You Are Kidding, Mr. Hitler?") - performed by Bud Flanagan and the Orchestra of the Band of the Coldstream Guards
The Daily Show ("Dog on Fire") - Bob Mould; performed by They Might Be Giants
Daktari - Shelly Manne and Henryk Vars
Dallas - Jerrold Immel
Damages ("When I Am Through With You") - The VLA
Dan August ("Dan August Theme") - Dave Grusin
Danger Man - Series 1 "The Danger Man Theme" Edwin Astley, series 2–4 "High Wire" Edwin Astley, series 2–4 in the U.S. as Secret Agent, "Secret Agent Man" theme composed by P. F. Sloan and Steve Barri, and recorded by Johnny Rivers.
Daniel Boone - Vera Matson and Lionel Newman; (sung by The Imperials)
Daniel Tiger's Neighborhood ("Won't You Be My Neighbor") - Fred Rogers, David Kelly, James Chapple, Brian Pickett and Graeme Cornies
Danny Phantom - Guy Moon and Butch Hartman
The Danny Thomas Show - Earle Hagen and Herbert W. Spencer
Darcy's Wild Life - Fan 3
Daria ("You're Standing on My Neck") - Splendora
Dark ("Goodbye") - Apparat
Dark Angel - Chuck D and Gary G-Wiz
Dark Shadows - Bob Cobert
The Darling Buds of May - Pip Burley
Dave's World ("You May Be Right") - Billy Joel, performed by Southside Johnny
David Cassidy: Man Undercover ("Hard Crimes") - David Cassidy
Davis Rules - Mark Mothersbaugh
Dawson's Creek ("I Don't Want to Wait") - Paula Cole
Day by Day - Sammy Cahn, Axel Stordahl and Paul Weston (performed by Clydine Jackson)
The Days and Nights of Molly Dodd - Patrick Williams
Days of Our Lives - Charles Albertine, Tommy Boyce and Bobby Hart
DC Super Hero Girls ("Super Life") - Kay Hanley and Michelle Lewis
Deadwood - David Schwartz
Dear John - theme song composed by John Sullivan, vocal by Wendy Talbot
The Debbie Reynolds Show ("With a Little Love (Just a Little Love)") - Debbie Reynolds
The Defenders - Leonard Rosenman
Defiance - Bear McCreary
Definition ("Soul Bossa Nova") - Quincy Jones
Degrassi: The Next Generation ("Whatever it Takes") - Dalbello
Delta ("Climb That Mountain High") - Reba McEntire
Delta House - Michael Simmons
The Dennis O'Keefe Show - Leon Klatzkin
Dennis the Menace - William Loose and John Seely
Department S - Edwin Astley
Designing Women ("Georgia on My Mind") - performed as an instrumental by Doc Severinsen , Bruce Miller  and Ray Charles 
Desmond's ("Don't Scratch My Soca") - Norman Beaton 
Desperate Housewives - Danny Elfman
Devious Maids - Edward Shearmur
Dexter - Rolfe Kent
Dexter's Laboratory - Thomas Chase and Steve Rucker
Dharma & Greg - Dennis C. Brown
Diagnosis: Murder - Dick DeBenedictis
Diagnosis: Unknown ("Coffee's Theme") - Irwin Kostal, Edward Scott and Joe Hamilton
Dick Turpin - Denis King
The Dick Van Dyke Show  ("Keep Your Fingers Crossed") - Earle Hagen; unused lyrics by Morey Amsterdam
Diff'rent Strokes ("It Takes Diff'rent Strokes") - Alan Thicke, Al Burton and Gloria Loring
A Different World - Stu Gardner, Bill Cosby and Dawnn Lewis performed by Phoebe Snow ); Aretha Franklin , later Boyz II Men 
Dilbert - Danny Elfman
The Dinah Shore Chevy Show ("See The U.S.A. In Your Chevrolet") - Leo Corday and Leon Carr; performed by Dinah Shore
The District Nurse - Ronnie Hazlehurst
Doc ("Stand Still") - Billy Ray Cyrus
Doc McStuffins ("The Doc Is In") - China Anne McClain (seasons 1–3); Amber Riley (season 4)
Doctor Who ("Doctor Who theme music") - Ron Grainer, originally arranged by Delia Derbyshire
Dodger, Bonzo and the Rest ("Our House") - composed by Madness Performed by cast
Dog the Bounty Hunter - Ozzy Osbourne
Dolly ("Love Is Like a Butterfly") - Dolly Parton
Dolly (1987) ("Baby I'm Burnin'") - Dolly Parton
Domestic Life  ("God Bless the Domestic Life") - Martin Mull
The Donna Reed Show ("Happy Days") - John Seely
Doogie Howser, M.D. - Mike Post
Doomwatch - Max Harris
Dora the Explorer - Billy Straus
The Doris Day Show ("Que Sera, Sera (Whatever Will Be, Will Be)") - Doris Day
Dorothy ("Learning from Each Other") - Dorothy Loudon
Down the Shore ("I Don't Wanna Go Home") - Southside Johnny and the Asbury Jukes
Down to Earth - Tom Wells 
Downton Abbey ("Did I Make the Most of Loving You?") - John Lunn
Downtown ("Money (That's What I Want)") - Ronnie Milsap
Dr. Kildare ("Three Stars Will Shine Tonight") - Jerry Goldsmith
Dr. Simon Locke/Police Surgeon - Richard Markowitz 
Dr. Slump ("Waiwai World") - Shunsuke Kikuchi
Dragnet - Main Theme ("Danger Ahead") by Miklós Rózsa; "Dragnet March" by Walter Schumann; 1967 closing theme by Lyn Murray
Dragon Ball Z (1996 English dub) - Main Title ("Rock the Dragon") by Ron Wasserman and Jeremy Sweet
Drake & Josh ("I Found a Way") - Drake Bell
The Drew Carey Show ; ; 
Duck Dodgers - Tom Jones and The Flaming Lips
Duck Dynasty ("Sharp Dressed Man") - ZZ Top
The Duck Factory ("Sure Beats Working for a Living") - Mark Vieha 
DuckTales - Mark Mueller
DuckTales (2017) - Felicia Barton
Dudley Do-Right - Sheldon Allman and Stan Worth
Duet - Ursula Walker and Tony Franklin
The Dukes of Hazzard ("Good Ol' Boys") - Waylon Jennings
The Dumplings ("Two By Two, Side by Side") - Steve Lawrence
Dusty's Trail - Frank De Vol and Sherwood Schwartz; (performed by Mel Street)
Dynasty - Bill Conti

E - F
Early Edition - W. G. Snuffy Walden
East Side West Side - Kenyon Hopkins
EastEnders ("EastEnders theme tune") - Simon May and Leslie Osborne
Easy Street - Loni Anderson
ECW Hardcore TV ("This is Extreme!") - Harry Slash & The Slashtones
Ed ("Next Year") - Foo Fighters
Ed, Edd n Eddy - Patric Caird
The Ed Sullivan Show ("Toast") - Ray Bloch
Eight Is Enough - Grant Goodeve
Eisenhower and Lutz ("Boys Like You") - Amanda McBroom
Electra Woman and Dyna Girl - Jimmie Haskell
Electric Circus 
The Electric Company - Theme song composed by Eric Rogers; performed by original cast
The Electric Company (2009 TV series) - "Turn Up The Power" - original cast
Elena of Avalor - Gaby Moreno
Ellen ("So Called Friend") - Texas
The Ellen Burstyn Show ("Nothing in the World Like Love") - Rita Coolidge
Ellery Queen - Elmer Bernstein
Emergency! - Nelson Riddle and Billy May
The Emperor's New School ("Kuzco Academy") - Danny Jacob
Empty Nest ("Life Goes On") - John Bettis and George Tipton, performed by Billy Vera
Entertainment Tonight - Michael Mark
Entourage ("Superhero") - Jane's Addiction
The Equalizer - Stewart Copeland
ER - James Newton Howard
The Eve Arden Show - Wilbur Hatch
Evening Shade - Instrumental theme by Sonny Curtis (1990–1992); Theme with lyrics by Bobby Goldsboro (1992–1994)
Everybody Hates Chris - Marcus Miller
Everybody Loves Raymond - Rick Marotta and Terry Trotter
The Evil Touch - Laurie Lewis
The Exile - Michel Rubini
F Troop - William Lava and Irving Taylor
The F Word - Babybird
The Facts of Life - Al Burton, Gloria Loring, and Alan Thicke
Fair Exchange - Cyril J. Mockridge
The Fairly OddParents - Ron Jones and Butch Hartman
Falcon Crest - Bill Conti
The Fall and Rise of Reginald Perrin - Ronnie Hazlehurst 
The Fall Guy ("Unknown Stuntman") - Lee Majors
Fame ("Fame") - Dean Pitchford and Michael Gore; performed by Erica Gimpel (seasons 1–4) Loretta Chandler (seasons 5–6)
Family - John Rubinstein
Family Affair - Frank De Vol
Family Guy (opening with a parody of the All in the Family theme) - Walter Murphy
Family Law ("War") - Edwin Starr and the Brink 
Family Matters ("As Days Go By") - Jesse Frederick
Family Ties ("Without Us") - Jeff Barry and Tom Scott; 
The Famous Teddy Z - written by Guy Moon, Stephanie Tyrell and Steve Tyrell; performed by Bill Champlin
Fancy Nancy ("Add a Little Fancy") - Matthew Tishler and Krista Tucker
Fantasy Island - Laurence Rosenthal
Far Out Space Nuts - Michael Lloyd
The Farmer's Daughter - Barry Mann and Cynthia Weil
Farscape - Guy Gross
Fast Layne ("Just Wanna Go") - Rayla
The Fast Show - ("Release Me") by Eddie Miller, performed by Paul Whitehouse
Fast Times - Oingo Boingo
Fastlane - Snoop Dogg and Charlie Clouser
Father Dowling Mysteries - Dick DeBenedictis
Father Knows Best - Don Ferris and Izzy Friedman
Father Ted ("Songs Of Love") - The Divine Comedy
Fawlty Towers - Dennis Wilson
Fay ("Coming Into My Own") - Jaye P. Morgan
The F.B.I. - Bronislaw Kaper
Felicity ("Felicity Theme) - J. J. Abrams (seasons 1–2); ("New Version of You") - Andrew Jarecki (seasons 3–4)
The Felony Squad - Pete Rugolo
Film... ("I Wish I Knew How It Would Feel to Be Free") - Billy Taylor
Filthy Rich - Bucky Jones and Ronnie McDowell
Fireball XL5 ("Fireball") - Don Spencer
Firefly ("Ballad of Serenity") - Sonny Rhodes
Firing Line ("Brandenburg Concertos") - Johann Sebastian Bach
First Impressions - Harry Nilsson
Fish - Jack Elliott and Allyn Ferguson
Fish Hooks ("Ring the Bell") - Jeremy Fisher
Flamingo Road - Gerald Fried
The Flintstones ("Meet The Flintstones") - Hoyt Curtin, William Hanna and Joseph Barbera
Flipper - Henryk Wars and "By" Dunham (performed by Frankie Randall)
Flo ("Flo's Yellow Rose") - Hoyt Axton
Flying Blind ("A Million Miles Away") - David Byrne
The Flying Nun ("Who Needs Wings to Fly?") - Dominic Frontiere
Forever Knight - Fred Mollin
Formula One (BBC) ("The Chain") - Fleetwood Mac
Foster's Home for Imaginary Friends - James L. Venable
The Four Just Men - Francis Chagrin
Fraggle Rock ("Down at Fraggle Rock") - Philip Balsam and Dennis Lee
Frank's Place ("Do You Know What It Means to Miss New Orleans?") - Louis Armstrong
Franklin ("Hey It's Franklin") - Bruce Cockburn
Frasier ("Tossed Salads and Scrambled Eggs") - Kelsey Grammer
Freaks and Geeks ("Bad Reputation") - Joan Jett
Free Spirit ("She's a Free Spirit") - Steve Dorff and John Bettis
French and Saunders - Rowland Rivron
The Fresh Beat Band ("The Fresh Beat Band!") - Matter Music  (Sung by Yvette Gonzalez-Nacer, Thomas Hobson, Shayna Rose/Tara Perry, and Jon Beavers)
Fresh Beat Band of Spies - Peter Zizzo
The Fresh Prince of Bel-Air ("Yo' Home to Bel-Air") - DJ Jazzy Jeff & the Fresh Prince
Friday Night Dinner - ("Animal") - Miike Snow
Friday the 13th: The Series - Fred Mollin
Friends ("I'll Be There For You") - The Rembrandts
The Fugitive - Pete Rugolo
Full House ("Everywhere You Look") - Jesse Frederick
Fuller House ("Everywhere You Look remix version") - Carly Rae Jepsen
Futurama - Christopher Tyng

G - H
Gabby Duran & the Unsittables ("I Do My Thing") - Kylie Cantrall
Game of Thrones - Ramin Djawadi
Game On - ("Where I Find My Heaven") by the Gigolo Aunts
Game Shakers ("Drop Dat What") - Kel Mitchell
Garroway at Large ("Sentimental Journey") - Les Brown, Ben Homer and Bud Green
The Garry Moore Show ("Thanks for Dropping By") - Joe Hamilton
The Gene Autry Show ("Back in the Saddle Again") - Gene Autry and Ray Whitley
Gentle Ben - Harry Sukman
The George Burns and Gracie Allen Show ("Love Nest") - Louis Hirsch and Otto Harbach
The George Burns Show - Jeff Alexander
George Lopez ("Low Rider") - War
George of the Jungle - Stan Worth and Sheldon Allman
Get a Life ("Stand") - R.E.M.
The Get Along Gang - Shuki Levy and Haim Saban
Get Smart - Irving Szathmary
Get Some In! - Alan Braden, performed by cast
Getting Together - Bobby Sherman
The Ghost & Mrs. Muir - Dave Grusin
The Ghost Busters ("We're the Ghost Busters") - Forrest Tucker and Larry Storch
Ghost Story - Billy Goldenberg
Gideon's Way - Edwin Astley
Gidget ("(Wait Till You See) My Gidget") - Howard Greenfield and Jack Keller 
Gilligan's Island ("The Ballad of Gilligan's Isle") - Sherwood Schwartz and George Wyle 
Gilmore Girls ("Where You Lead") - performed by Carole King and Louise Goffin
Gimme a Break! - Nell Carter
Girl Meets World - ("Take On the World") - Sabrina Carpenter and Rowan Blanchard
Girlfriends ("My Girlfriend") - Angie Stone
Gogglebox ("Perfect World") - Kodaline
Go! Go! Cory Carson - Ryan Shore
The Goldbergs ("Rewind") - I Fight Dragons
The Golden Girls and The Golden Palace 
Gomer Pyle, U.S.M.C. - Earle Hagen
Good Luck Charlie ("Hang in There Baby") - Bridgit Mendler
The Good Guys ("Two Good Guys") - Jay Livingston, Ray Evans and Jerry Fielding
The Good Life - Tony Orlando and Dawn
Good Morning, Miami ("Once in a Lifetime") - John Rzeznik
Good Morning, Miss Bliss ("These Are the Best of Times") - Charles Fox
The Good Place - David Schwartz
Good Sports ("Boom Boom Boom") - Al Green
Good Times ("Good Times") - composed by Dave Grusin, Alan and Marilyn Bergman; performed by Jim Gilstrap and Blinky Wiiliams
Good Witch - Jack Lenz
The Goodies ("The Goodies Theme) - Bill Oddie and Michael Gibbs
Goodnight Sweetheart - Ray Noble, Jimmy Campbell and Reg Connelly, performed by Al Bowlly
Goof Troop - Phil Perry
Gossip Girl ("Steps of the Met") - Transcenders
Grange Hill ("Chicken Man") - Alan Hawkshaw
Grand Prix Wrestling ("Let There Be Drums") - Incredible Bongo Band
Grandstand ("News Scoop") - Len Stevens and Keith Mansfield
Gravity Falls - Brad Breeck
The Greatest American Hero ("Theme from The Greatest American Hero (Believe It or Not)") - Mike Post and Stephen Geyer (performed by Joey Scarbury)
Green Acres - composed by Vic Mizzy; performed by Eddie Albert and Eva Gabor
The Green Green Grass ("The Green Green Grass") - composed and performed by John Sullivan
The Green Hornet ("Flight of the Bumblebee") - Nikolai Rimsky-Korsakov; orchestration by Billy May; conducted by Lionel Newman; trumpet solo by Al Hirt
Grey's Anatomy ("Cosy in the Rocket") - Psapp
The Grim Adventures of Billy & Mandy - Gregory Hinde and Drew Neumann
Grounded for Life - Ween
Growing Pains ("As Long As We Got Each Other") - 
The Guardian ("Empire on My Mind") - The Wallflowers
Gullah Gullah Island - Peter Lurye
Gun ("Happiness is a Warm Gun") - John Lennon and Paul McCartney; performed by U2
Gunsmoke ("Old Trail") - Rex Koury
H2O: Just Add Water ("No Ordinary Girl") - Ellie Henderson (season 1), Kate Alexa (season 2) and Indiana Evans (season 3)
Hancock's Half Hour - Angela Morley
Handy Manny - Los Lobos
Hanging In - Billy Byers
Hannah Montana ("The Best of Both Worlds") - Miley Cyrus
Hank - Johnny Mercer and Frank Perkins
Happy Days 
Hardball ("Roll it Over") - Eddie Money
Hardcastle and McCormick ("Drive") - David Morgan; ("Back to Back") - Joey Scarbury
The Hardy Boys/Nancy Drew Mysteries - Glen A. Larson and Stu Phillips
Harper Valley PTA - Jeannie C. Riley
Harry and the Hendersons ("Your Feets Too Big") - Leon Redbone
Harry O - Billy Goldenberg 
Harry's Game - Clannad
Harsh Realm - Mark Snow
Hart to Hart - Mark Snow
Harts of the West ("In a Laid Back Way") - Clint Black
The Harvey Korman Show ("Living Life Today") - Harvey Korman
Have Gun – Will Travel ("The Ballad of Paladin") - Johnny Western, Richard Boone, and Sam Rolfe
Have I Got News for You - Big George
Hawaii Five-O - Morton Stevens 
Hawaiian Eye - Mack David and Jerry Livingston; (performed by Warren Barker)
Hawaiian Heat ("Goodbye Blues") - Tom Scott and Candy Patterson
Hazel ("Theme to Hazel") - Sammy Cahn and Jimmy Van Heusen; later version by The Modernaires
He & She - Jerry Fielding
Head of the Class - Ed Alton
Heartbeat - Bob Montgomery and Norman Petty, performed by Nick Berry
Heartland ("Dreamer") - Jenn Grant
The Heights ("How Do You Talk to an Angel") - The Heights
Hellsing ("Shine") - Mr. Big
Hennesey - Sonny Burke
Henry Hugglemonster ("Have a Henry Hugglemonster Day") - Matt Mahaffey
Herbie, the Love Bug ("Herbie, My Best Friend") - Dean Jones
Here Come the Brides ("Seattle") - Bobby Sherman
Here's Boomer - Edward Leonetti and Zoey Wilson
Here's Lucy - Wilbur Hatch
Hetty Wainthropp Investigates - Nigel Hess
Hey Arnold! - Jim Lang
Hi-de-Hi! ("Holiday Rock") - composed by Jimmy Perry, performed by Ken Barrie
Hi Hi Puffy AmiYumi ("Hi Hi") - Puffy AmiYumi
Hi Honey, I'm Home! Rupert Holmes
Higglytown Heroes ("Here in Higglytown") - They Might Be Giants
The High Chapparal - David Rose
High Mountain Rangers - Lee Greenwood
Highlander: The Series ("Princes of the Universe") - Queen
Highway Patrol - David Rose
Highway to Heaven - David Rose
Hill Street Blues - Mike Post
The Hills ("Unwritten") - Natasha Bedingfield
The Hitchhiker - Paul Hoffert
The Hitchiker's Guide to the Galaxy - Bernie Leadon
The Hogan Family ("Together Through the Years") - Roberta Flack
Hogan's Heroes - Jerry Fielding
Home Improvement ("Iron John's Rock") - Dan Foliart
Homeland - Sean Callery
Hondo - Richard Markowitz
The Honeymooners ("You're My Greatest Love") - Jackie Gleason
Hot in Cleveland - Ron Wasserman and Emerson Swinford
Horseland ("Let's Go to Horseland") - Slumber Party Girls
Hotel - Henry Mancini
House ("Teardrop") - Massive Attack
How I Met Your Mother ("Hey Beautiful") - The Solids
How to Get Away with Murder - Photek
How to Rock ("Only You Can Be You") - Cymphonique Miller
Hugh and I - Angela Morley
Human Target - Bear McCreary
Hunter - Mike Post and Pete Carpenter

I - J
I Am Weasel - April March
I Didn't Know You Cared - Ronnie Hazlehurst
I Didn't Do It ("Time of Our Lives") - Olivia Holt
I Dream of Jeannie - Season 1 theme by Richard Wess; seasons 2–5 by Hugo Montenegro and Buddy Kaye
I Love Lucy - Eliot Daniel
I Married Joan - Richard Mack
I Spy - Earle Hagen
I'll Fly Away - W. G. Snuffy Walden
I'm a Big Girl Now - Diana Canova
iCarly ("Leave It All to Me") - Miranda Cosgrove and featuring Drake Bell
The Immortal - Dominic Frontiere
Impact! ("Megatron") - Crazy Town
In Living Color - 
In the Heat of the Night - music by Quincy Jones, lyrics by Alan and Marilyn Bergman, performed by Bill Champlin
The Inbetweeners ("Gone Up in Flames") - Morning Runner
The Incredible Hulk ("The Lonely Man") - Joe Harnell
In Sickness and in Health - Chas & Dave
The Inspector (Theme from A Shot in the Dark) - Henry Mancini
Inspector Gadget - Shuki Levy and Haim Saban
Inspector Morse - Barrington Pheloung
Interpol Calling - Clifton Parker
The Invaders - Dominic Frontiere
The Invisible Man (1958) - Sydney John Kay
The Invisible Man (1975) - Henry Mancini
Ironside - Quincy Jones
The IT Crowd - Neil Hannon
It Ain't Half Hot Mum ("Meet the Gang") - composed by Jimmy Perry, performed by cast
It Takes a Thief - Dave Grusin
It Takes Two ("Where Loves Spends the Night") - Paul Williams and Crystal Gayle
It's a Living - composed by George Tipton, performed by Leslie Bricusse
It's About Time - Sherwood Schwartz, George Wyle and Gerald Fried
It's Garry Shandling's Show - Joey Carbone
The Jack Benny Program (end credit theme, "The J & M Stomp") - Mahlon Merrick
The Jackie Gleason Show ("Melancholy Serenade") - Jackie Gleason
Jackpot, 1974–75 version ("Jet Set") - Mike Vickers (later used for This Week in Baseball) 
JAG - Bruce Broughton
Jake and the Fatman - Dick DeBenedictis
Jake and the Never Land Pirates - Captain Bogg and Salty
James at 15 ("James") - Lee Montgomery
The Jamie Foxx Show ("Here Comes Jamie Foxx") and ("The Simple Things Are All I Need") - both performed by Jamie Foxx
Jane and the Dragon - Tajja Isen
Jay Jay the Jet Plane - Parachute Express
The Jean Arthur Show ("Merry Merry-Go-Round") - Johnny Keating, Jay Richard Kennedy and Richard Quine
Jeeves and Wooster - Anne Dudley
Jellystone! - Ego Plum
Jennifer Slept Here - composed by Perry Botkin Jr., written by Clint Holmes, Ann Jillian, Joey Murcia, and Bill Payne, performed by Joey Scarbury
The Jeffersons ("Movin' On Up") - Jeff Barry and Ja'Net DuBois
Jeopardy! ("Think Music") - Merv Griffin
Jesse ("Time for You") - The Tories
Jessie ("Hey Jessie") - Debby Ryan
The Jetsons - Hoyt Curtin, William Hanna and Joseph Barbera
Jimmy Kimmel Live! - Robert Goulet
The Jimmy Stewart Show - Jeff Alexander
Joan of Arcadia ("One of Us") - Joan Osborne
Joanie Loves Chachi ("You Look at Me") - Scott Baio and Erin Moran
Jodi Arias: Dirty Little Secret ("Dirty Little Secret") - The All-American Rejects
Joey ("Sunny Hours") - Long Beach Dub Allstars featuring will.i.am
The Joey Bishop Show  
John from Cincinnati ("Johnny Appleseed") - The Mescaleros
The John Larroquette Show ("Skrewy St. Louis Blues") - David Cassidy
Johnny Ringo - Don Durant
Johnny Staccato ("Staccato's Theme") - Elmer Bernstein
Johnny Test ("Johnny Test opening theme") - Kevin Manthei (season 1), Kevin Riepl (season 1) and Ian LeFeuvre (seasons 2–6)
Jonas ("Live to Party") - Jonas Brothers
Jonny Quest - Hoyt Curtin
Julia - ("Julia's Theme") - Elmer Bernstein (seasons 1 and 2) and Jeff Alexander (season 3)
Jungle Junction ("Deep Inside the Jungle") - Peter Lurye
Just Good Friends - John Sullivan and Ronnie Hazlehurst, performed by Paul Nicholas 
Just Say Julie - The Usual Suspects
Just Shoot Me! ("Life Keeps Bringin' Me Back to You") - vocal by Lauren Wood
Just the Ten of Us ("Doin' it the Best I Can") - lyrics by John Bettis and Steve Dorff; (performed by Bill Medley)
Justice ("Crown Imperial") - William Walton
Justified ("Long Hard Times to Come") - Gangstagrass

K - L
KaBlam! ("Skaternity") - The Toasters (affiliated as The Moon Ska Stompers)
Karen - Jack Marshall and Bob Mosher (performed by The Beach Boys)
Kate & Allie (Along Comes a Friend") - John Loeffler
Kath & Kim ("The Joker") - sung by Gina Riley
Kath & Kim (American) ("Filthy/Gorgeous") - Scissor Sisters
K.C. Undercover ("Keep It Undercover") - Zendaya
Keeping Up Appearances - Nick Ingham
Kenan & Kel (Aw, Here it Goes") - Coolio
Kim Possible ("Call Me, Beep Me!") - Christina Milian
The King of Queens ("Baby All My Life I Will Be Driving Home to You") - Billy Vera
King of the Hill - The Refreshments
King's Crossing - Jerrold Immel
Kingdom Hospital ("Worry About You") - Ivy
Knight & Daye - David Michael Frank
Knight Rider - Glen A. Larson and Stu Phillips (later arrangement of theme was done by Don Peake)
Knots Landing - Jerrold Immel
Kojak - Billy Goldenberg (seasons 1–4); later version by John Cacavas (season 5)
KonoSuba ("Fantastic Dreamer") - Machico
Kolchak: The Night Stalker - Gil Mellé
Krystala - Aegis
Kung Fu - Jim Helms
The L Word ("The Way That We Live") - Betty
L.A. Law - Mike Post
La Femme Nikita - Mark Snow
Laguna Beach: The Real Orange County ("Come Clean") - Hilary Duff
Lancer - Jerome Moross
Land of the Giants - John Williams (two themes)
Land of the Lost - Linda Laurie and Michael Lloyd
Land of the Lost (1991) - Kevin Kiner
Laramie - Cyril J. Mockridge
Laredo - Russell Garcia
Las Vegas ("A Little Less Conversation") - Elvis Presley (remix by Junkie XL)
Lassie - Les Baxter
Last of the Summer Wine - Ronnie Hazlehurst 
Laverne & Shirley ("Making Our Dreams Come True") - Charles Fox and Norman Gimbel (sung by Cyndi Grecco)
Law & Order  ("Theme of Law & Order") - Mike Post
Law & Order: Criminal Intent ("Theme of Law & Order: Criminal Intent") - Mike Post
Law & Order: Special Victims Unit ("Theme of Law & Order: Special Victims Unit") - Mike Post
Law & Order: Trial by Jury ("Theme of Law & Order: Trial by Jury") - Mike Post
LazyTown ("Welcome to LazyTown") - Jón Jósep Snæbjörnsson
Leave It to Beaver ("The Toy Parade") - David Kahn, Melvyn Leonard and Mort Greene (Season 6 arrangement by Pete Rugolo)
The Legend of Tarzan ("Two Worlds") - Phil Collins
Legend of the Seeker - Joseph LoDuca
Liberty's Kids ("Through My Own Eyes") - Aaron Carter and Kayla Hinkle
Lie to Me ("Brand New Day") - Ryan Star
Life as We Know It ("Sooner or Later") - Michael Tolcher
Life Goes On (A cover version of The Beatles' "Ob-La-Di, Ob-La-Da") - Patti LuPone and the rest of the cast
Life with Lucy ("Every Day is Better Than Before") - Eydie Gormé
Lifestyles of the Rich and Famous ("Come With Me Now") - Bill Conti and Norman Gimbel
Lilo & Stitch: The Series ("Aloha, E Komo Mai") - Jump5
The Lion Guard ("Call of the Guard") - The Lion King Chorus
Lipstick Jungle ("The Bomb") - Bitter:Sweet
Little Einsteins - Billy Straus
Little House on the Prairie - David Rose
Little Witch Academia ("Shiny Ray") - Yurika
Littlest Pet Shop - Daniel Ingram
Liv and Maddie ("Better in Stereo") - Dove Cameron
The Liver Birds - written and performed by The Scaffold
Living Dolls ("Take Your Best Shot") - John Beasley
Living Single ("We Are Living Single") - Queen Latifah
Living with Lydia - "Humoresque" (opening); "Dim Sum Song" (closing, performed by Lydia Shum)
Lizzie McGuire - "We'll Figure It Out" - Angie Jaree
Lois & Clark: The New Adventures of Superman - Jay Gruska
The Lone Gunmen - Mark Snow
The Lone Ranger ("William Tell Overture") - Gioachino Rossini
Looney Tunes ("The Merry-Go-Round Broke Down") - Carl W. Stalling
Lost in Space - John Williams (two themes)
Lottery! ("Turn of the Cards") - Alan Graham
Lou Grant - Patrick Williams
The Loud House - Michelle Lewis, Doug Rockwell and Chris Savino
Love, American Style - Charles Fox and Arnold Margolin (performed first season by The Cowsills; seasons 2–5 by The Ron Hicklin Singers)
The Love Boat - Paul Williams and Charles Fox (sung by Jack Jones) (seasons 1–8); by Dionne Warwick (season 9)
Lovejoy - Denis King
Love Live! - Yoshiaki Fujisawa; ("Snow Halation") - Takahiro Yamada
Love of Life ("The Life That You Love") - Carey Gold
Love, Sidney ("Friends Forever") - (Opening theme by Tony Randall, Swoosie Kurtz & Kaleena Kiff), (Closing theme by Gladys & Bubba Knight)
Love Thy Neighbor - Solomon Burke
The Lucy–Desi Comedy Hour - Wilbur Hatch
The Lucy Show - Wilbur Hatch
Lush Life - Terence Trent D'Arby

M - N
M*A*S*H ("Suicide Is Painless") - Johnny Mandel
MacGyver - Randy Edelman
Mad About You ("Final Frontier") - Andrew Gold
Mad Men ("A Beautiful Mine") - RJD2
Magnum, P.I. - Ian Freebairn-Smith (Season 1); Mike Post and Pete Carpenter (remaining seasons)
Makin' It ("Makin' It (song)") - David Naughton
Malcolm in the Middle ("Boss of Me") - They Might Be Giants
Mama's Family ("Bless My Happy Home") - Peter Matz; unused lyrics by Vicki Lawrence
The Man from U.N.C.L.E. - Jerry Goldsmith
Man in a Suitcase - Ron Grainer
Man of the World - Henry Mancini
Maniac Mansion - Jane Siberry and Mary Margaret O'Hara
Mannix - Lalo Schifrin
The Many Loves of Dobie Gillis 
Marcus Welby, M.D. - Leonard Rosenman
Marriage Lines - Dennis Wilson
Married... with Children ("Love and Marriage") - Sammy Cahn and Jimmy Van Heusen; performed by Frank Sinatra
Mary Hartman, Mary Hartman ("Premiere Occasion") - Barry White (pseudonym of Robert Charles Kingston); performed by the Westway Studio Orchestra
The Mary Tyler Moore Show ("Love Is All Around") - Sonny Curtis
Masquerade - Crystal Gayle
Match Game ("A Swingin' Safari") - Billy Vaughn
Matlock - Dick DeBenedictis
Matt Houston - Dominic Frontiere
Maude ("And Then There's Maude") - lyrics by Alan and Marilyn Bergman by Dave Grusin; sung by Donny Hathaway
Maverick - David Buttolph and Paul Francis Webster
Max Headroom - Michael Hoenig
Max Monroe: Loose Cannon ("Tied Up") - Yello
May to December ("September Song") - Kurt Weill and Maxwell Anderson, adapted by Mark Warman
Mayberry It's Me ("Everything U R") - Lindsay Pagano (first half of series); ("I'd Do Anything") - Simple Plan (second half of series)
Mayberry R.F.D. ("Mayberry March") - Earle Hagen and Carl Brandt
McClain's Law - James Di Pasquale
McCloud - Glen A. Larson
McHale's Navy - Axel Stordahl
McMillan & Wife - Jerry Fielding
Me and Maxx ("Is It Because of Love") - Leonore O'Malley
Me and Mom - Amy Holland
Me and Mrs. C. - Deborah Malone
Meet the Wife - Dennis Wilson
Medical Center  - Lalo Schifrin
Melba ("We're Sisters") - Melba Moore
Melrose Place - Tim Truman
Miami Vice ("Miami Vice Theme") - Jan Hammer
Mickey Mouse Clubhouse - They Might Be Giants
Mickey Mouse Mixed-Up Adventures - Beau Black
Mickey Spillane's Mike Hammer ("Harlem Nocturne") - Earle Hagen
Midnight Caller - Brad Fiedel
The Midnight Special ("Midnight Special") - Johnny Rivers
Midsomer Murders - Jim Parker
Mighty Med ("You Never Know") - Brandon Mychal Smith and Adam Hicks
Mighty Morphin Alien Rangers - Ron Wasserman
Mighty Morphin Power Rangers ("Go Go Power Rangers") - Ron Wasserman
Mike & Molly ("I See Love") - Keb' Mo'
Mike, Lu & Og - Igor Yuzov and Oleg Bernov
Miles from Tomorrowland ("Way Out") - Beau Black
Millennium - Mark Snow
Milo Murphy's Law (It's My World (And We're All Living in It") - "Weird Al" Yankovic
Minder ("I Could Be So Good For You") - Gerard Kenny and Patricia Waterman, performed by Dennis Waterman
Mira, Royal Detective - Matthew Tishler and Jeannie Lurie
Miraculous: Tales of Ladybug & Cat Noir ("It's Ladybug") -  Wendy Child, and Cash Callaway; (English theme by Noam Kaniel)
The Misadventures of Sheriff Lobo ("Ballad of Sheriff Lobo") - Frankie Laine
Mission: Impossible  ("Theme from Mission: Impossible") - Lalo Schifrin
Mister Ed - Jay Livingston and Ray Evans
Mister Peepers - Bernard Green
Mister Roberts - Frank Perkins and Stan Kenton
Mister Rogers' Neighborhood ("Won't You Be My Neighbor") - Fred Rogers and Johnny Costa
Mobile Suit Zeta Gundam ("Mizu no Hoshi e Ai wo Komete") - Hiroko Moriguchi; written by Masao Urino and Neil Sedaka
Mock the Week ("News of the World") - The Jam
The Mod Squad - Earle Hagen
Moesha ("Gotta Move") - Brandy Norwood
Mom ("Overture" from Ruslan and Lyudmila) - performed by Mikhail Glinka
Monday Night Football ("Heavy Action") - Johnny Pearson; ("All My Rowdy Friends are Here on Monday Night") - Hank Williams Jr.
Monk - Instrumental theme by Jeff Beal in season 1, and "It's a Jungle Out There" by Randy Newman from seasons 2–8.
The Monkees  ("(Theme From) The Monkees") - Boyce and Hart (performed by The Monkees)
Monty Python's Flying Circus ("The Liberty Bell (march)") - John Philip Sousa
Moonlighting ("Moonlighting (theme song)") - Al Jarreau
Mork & Mindy - Perry Botkin Jr.
The Mothers-in-Law - Jeff Alexander
Movin' On - Merle Haggard 
Mr. Bean - Howard Goodall, adapted from "Locus iste" by Anton Bruckner) and performed by the Choir of Southwark Cathedral 
Mr. Belvedere ("According to Our New Arrival") - Leon Redbone
Mr. Lucky - Henry Mancini
Mr. Terrific - Gerald Fried
¡Mucha Lucha! - Chicos de Barrio
Mulligan's Stew ("We Got to Stick Together") - Michael Lloyd
The Munsters - Jack Marshall
Muppet Babies - Hank Saroyan and Rob Walsh
Muppet Babies - Renée Elise Goldsberry
The Muppet Show - ("The Muppet Show Theme") - Jim Henson and Sam Pottle
Murder One - Mike Post
Murder, She Wrote ("JB Fletcher's Theme") - John Addison
Murdoch Mysteries - Robert Carli
Murphy Brown - Steve Dorff
Murphy Law - Al Jarreau
My Babysitter's a Vampire ("Girl Next Door") - Copperot
My Favorite Martian - George Greeley
My Friends Tigger & Pooh - Kay Hanley (season 1), Chloë Grace Moretz (seasons 2–3)
My Life as a Teenage Robot - Peter Lurye
My Little Pony: Friendship is Magic ("Friendship is Magic/My Very Best Friends") - Daniel Ingram and Steffan Andrews
My Living Doll - George Greeley
My Mother the Car - Paul Hampton
My Secret Identity - Fred Mollin (S1-2), Brad MacDonald (S3)
My Sister Eileen - Earle Hagen
My Sister Sam ("Room Enough for Two") - Kim Carnes
My So-Called Life - W. G. Snuffy Walden
My Three Sons - Frank De Vol
My Two Dads ("You Can Count on Me") - Greg Evigan
My Wife Next Door - Dennis Wilson
My World and Welcome to It - Warren Barker and Danny Arnold (composers); Paul Beaver and Bernard Krause (co-composers, electronic music performance)
Mystery Science Theater 3000 - seasons 0-5 Joel Hodgson, seasons 5-10 Michael J. Nelson
Naked City 
The Nancy Walker Show ("Nancy's Blues") - Marvin Hamlisch by Alan and Marilyn Bergman (performed by Nancy Walker)
The Nanny ("The Nanny Named Fran") - Ann Hampton Callaway (performed with Liz Callaway)
Nanny and the Professor ("Nanny") - Addrisi Brothers
Nash Bridges ("I Got a Friend in You") - Eddie Jobson 
Nashville 99 - Jerry Reed
Nasty Boys ("Nasty") - Lisa Keith
NBA on NBC ("Roundball Rock") - John Tesh
The NBC Mystery Movie - Henry Mancini
NBC Nightly News ("The Mission") - John Williams
NCIS - Numeriklab
NCIS: Los Angeles - James S. Levine
NCIS: New Orleans ("Boom Boom") - John Lee Hooker; performed by Big Head Todd and the Monsters
Neighbours - Tony Hatch and Jackie Trent, performed by Barry Crocker (nine variant versions since 1988)
Neon Genesis Evangelion ("A Cruel Angel's Thesis") - Yoko Takahashi
Neon Rider - Bill Henderson
New Attitude - Sheryl Lee Ralph
The New Avengers - Laurie Johnson
The New Gidget ("One in a Million") - Marek Norman
New Girl ("Hey Girl") - Zooey Deschanel
The New Scooby-Doo Movies - Hoyt Curtin
The New Statesman - Alan Hawkshaw, based on the Promenade from Pictures at an Exhibition by Russian composer Modest Mussorgsky
New Tricks ("It's Alright") - Mike Moran, composed by Dennis Waterman
The New WKRP in Cincinnati - Tom Wells
Newhart - Henry Mancini
NewsRadio - Mike Post 
NFL on CBS ("Posthumus Zone") - E.S. Posthumus
NFL on Fox  - Scott Schreer
Night Court - Jack Elliott
Night Gallery - Billy Goldenberg (pilot) Gil Mellé (seasons 1–2) and Eddie Sauter (season 3)
Night Heat - B. J. Cook and Domenic Troiano
Nip/Tuck ("A Perfect Line") - The Engine Room
Norm ("Too Bad") - Doug and the Slugs
Not in Front of the Children - Ronnie Hazlehurst
Not the Nine O'Clock News - Howard Goodall
Nurse Jackie - Lisa Coleman and Wendy Melvoin
N.Y.P.D. - Charles Gross
NYPD Blue - Mike Post

O - P
The Oblongs - They Might Be Giants
The O.C. ("California") - Phantom Planet
The Odd Couple - Neal Hefti
Odd Man Out - Max Harris
The Office (UK) ("Handbags and Gladrags")  arranged by Big George
The Office (US) - Jay Ferguson (performed by The Scrantones)
Oh Baby - Performed by Jimmy Beavers
Oh Doctor Beeching! - based on "Oh! Mr Porter" by Thomas and George Le Brunn, performed by Su Pollard 
OK K.O.! Let's Be Heroes ("Let's Watch the Show") - Jake Kaufman
Oliver Beene ("The Future Is Now") - The Solids
Once Upon a Time - Mark Isham
One Day at a Time ("This Is It") - Jeff Barry and Nancy Barry
One Tree Hill ("I Don't Want to Be") - Gavin DeGraw
Only Fools and Horses ("Only Fools and Horses"/ "Hooky Street") - written and performed by John Sullivan, arranged by Ronnie Hazlehurst 
Only When I Laugh - Ken Jones 
One Foot in the Grave - Written, composed and performed by Eric Idle
On the Buses - Tony Russell
Open All Hours - Max Harris, based on "Alice, Where Art Thou?", written by Joseph Ascher
Open House - John Beasley
Orange Is the New Black ("You've Got Time") - Regina Spektor
Orphan Black - Two Fingers
Our Miss Brooks - Wilbur Hatch
Out of the Box ("Out of the Box Opening Theme") - Peter Lurye; ("Until We Meet Again (Goodbye song") - Billy Straus
Out of This World (Contemporary version of "Swinging on a Star") - performed by Kevin Kiner
The Outer Limits (1963 TV series) - Dominic Frontiere (1) Harry Lubin (2)
The Outer Limits (1995 TV series) - Mark Mancina and John Van Tongeren
The Outsider - Pete Rugolo
The Owl House - T. J. Hill
Pair of Kings ("Top of the World") - Mitchel Musso and Doc Shaw
Pajanimals ("We're the Pajanimals") - Michael and Patty Silversher
The Paper Chase ("The First Years") - Seals and Crofts
The Parkers ("We're The Parkers") - Countess Vaughn
Party Girl ("It's My Life") - Carole Bayer Sager and Oliver Leiber
Party of Five ("Closer to Free") - BoDeans
The Partridge Family ("C'mon, Get Happy") - Wes Farrell, Diane Hilderbrand and Danny Janssen (performed by The Partridge Family)
The Patty Duke Show ("Cousins") - Sid Ramin and Robert Wells (performed by The Skip-Jacks)
PAW Patrol - Scott Krippayne
PB&J Otter - ("Oodelay-o") - Dan Sawyer
Peep and the Big Wide World - Taj Mahal
Peep Show - Daniel Pemberton (Series 1), ("Flagpole Sitta") - Harvey Danger (Season 2–9)
Penn Zero: Part-Time Hero - Ryan Shore and Beau Black
The People's Court ("The Big One") - Alan Tew
Peppa Pig - Julian Nott
Perfect Strangers ("Nothing's Gonna Stop Me Now") - David Pomeranz
Perry Mason ("Park Avenue Beat") - Fred Steiner
The Persuaders! - John Barry
Peter Gunn ("Peter Gunn (song)") - Henry Mancini
Petticoat Junction - Paul Henning and Curt Massey
Phenom ("The Promise and the Prize") - Carly Simon
Phil of the Future - Loren Ellis and the Drew Davis Band
The Phil Silvers Show - John Strauss
Phineas and Ferb ("Today Is Gonna Be a Great Day") - Bowling for Soup
Phyllis - Stan Daniels
Pingu (“Pingu Dance”) - David Hasselhoff
The Pink Panther Show - Doug Goodwin (three themes)
The Pink Panther Theme - Henry Mancini
Pistols 'n' Petticoats - composed and written by Jack Elliott and George Tibbles, performed by Elliott and Stanley Wilson
Planet of the Apes - Lalo Schifrin
Playboy After Dark ("Playboy's Theme") - Cy Coleman
Please Don't Eat the Daisies - Jeff Alexander
Pokémon: Indigo League - Jason Paige
Police Squad! ("Theme from Police Squad!") - Ira Newborn
Police Story - Jerry Goldsmith
Police Woman - Morton Stevens
Polka Dot Door ("The Polka Dot Door") - Dodi Robb and Pat Patterson
Porridge (1974 TV Series) - Max Harris
Postcards from Buster ("Hey Buster") - Wyclef Jean featuring 3 on 3
Potter - Ronnie Hazlehurst
The Powerpuff Girls - opening theme composed by James L. Venable and closing theme performed by BiS
The Powers That Be - Stephen Bishop
PrankStars ("Look On Your Face") - Mitchel Musso
The Pretender - Velton Ray Bunch and Mark Leggett
Pretty Little Liars ("Secret") - The Pierces
The Price Is Right - Edd Kalehoff
Princesses ("Some Day My Prince Will Come") - The Roches
Prison Break - Ramin Djawadi
Prisoner ("On the Inside") - Lynne Hamilton
The Prisoner - Ron Grainer
Private Benjamin ("Judy's Theme") - Barry De Vorzon, Dennis McCarthy and George Tipton
The Professionals - Laurie Johnson
Profiler - Angelo Badalamenti
The Protectors  ("Avenues and Alleyways") - Mitch Murray and Peter Callender,  performed by Tony Christie
The Proud Family - Solange Knowles featuring Destiny's Child
Providence ("In My Life) - composed by John Lennon and Paul McCartney; (Performed by Chantal Kreviazuk)
The Pruitts of Southampton - Vic Mizzy; (performed by Phyllis Diller)
P.S. I Luv U - Greg Evigan and Suzanne Fountain
Psych ("I Know, You Know") - The Friendly Indians
Pucca ("Love Recipe") - Yoon Joo-Hyeon and Kim-wook
Puella Magi Madoka Magica ("Connect") - ClariS
Punky Brewster ("Every Time I Turn Around") - Gary Portnoy
The Pursuit of Happiness - Mendy Lee

Q - R
Quantum Leap - Mike Post
Quark - Perry Botkin Jr.
Queen of Swords ("Behind the Mask") - composed by Spencer Proffer and Steve Plunkett (BMI); performed by José Feliciano
Queer as Folk 
Queer Duck - RuPaul
QI - Howard Goodall
Quincy, M.E. - Glen A. Larson and Stu Phillips
The Raccoons ("Run with Us") - Lisa Lougheed
Rab C. Nesbitt - David McNiven
Rainbow - Telltale
Randall and Hopkirk (Deceased) - Edwin Astley
Randall and Hopkirk - Nina Persson & David Arnold
Rapunzel's Tangled Adventure ("Wind in My Hair") - Mandy Moore; ("More of Me") - Natasha Bedingfield
The Rat Patrol - Dominic Frontiere
Rawhide - Ned Washington and Dimitri Tiomkin; performed by Frankie Laine
The Real Ghostbusters ("Ghostbusters") - Ray Parker Jr.
Real Stories of the Highway Patrol ("I'm Looking Out for You") - Belize
Reba ("I'm a Survivor") - Reba McEntire
The Rebel ("Ballad of Johnny Yuma") - Richard Markowitz and Andrew J. Fenady; performed by Johnny Cash
Red Dwarf ("In the Sun") - Howard Goodall, performed by Jenna Russell
The Red Skelton Show ("Holiday For Strings") - David Rose
The Redd Foxx Show ("Heart of the City") - Kool & the Gang
Remington Steele - Henry Mancini
Rescue Me ("C'mon C'mon") - The Von Bondies
Rhoda - Billy Goldenberg
The Riches - Toby Chu
Richie Brockelman, Private Eye ("School's Out") - Stephen Geyer and Bill Pederson
Ricki Lake - John Benitez
Ridiculousness ("Uncontrollable Urge") - Devo
The Rifleman - Herschel Burke Gilbert
Ripcord - Judith Pines
Ripley's Believe It or Not! - Henry Mancini
Ripping Yarns ("Fanfare from the ‘Facade Suite No. 2") by William Walton, conducted by Louis Frémaux, performed by the City of Birmingham Orchestra
Riptide - Mike Post and Pete Carpenter
Rise of the Teenage Mutant Ninja Turtles - Matt Mahaffey
Rising Damp - Dennis Wilson
The Road Runner Show - Barbara Cameron
Robin's Nest - Richard O'Sullivan and Brian Bennett
RoboCop ("Future to this Life") - Joe Walsh and Lita Ford
The Rocketeer ("Rocketeer to the Rescue") - Tammy Infusino
The Rockford Files ("The Rockford Files (theme)") - Mike Post and Pete Carpenter
Rocko’s Modern Life  - The B-52s and Tom Kenny 
The Rookies - Elmer Bernstein
Room 222 - Jerry Goldsmith
The Ropers - Joe Raposo
Roseanne - W. G. Snuffy Walden (later added with lyrics sung by Blues Traveler)
Rosie - Ronnie Hazelhurst, performed by Paul Greenwood
The Rosie O'Donnell Show - John McDaniel
Roswell ("Here with Me") - Dido
The Rousters ("Tough Enough") - Ronnie Milsap
Route 66 - Nelson Riddle
The Roy Rogers Show ("Happy Trails") - Roy Rogers and Dale Evans
The Royle Family ("Half The World Away") - Oasis
Rubbadubbers - ("Here Come the Rubbadubbers") - (KicK Production, performed by the main cast)
The Rubbish World of Dave Spud - Basement Jaxx
Rugrats - Bob Mothersbaugh and Mark Mothersbaugh
Rules of Engagement ("How Many Ways") - Señor Happy
Rumpole of the Bailey - Joseph Horovitz
Rutland Weekend Television - Neil Innes
Ryan's Hope ("Here's to Us") - Carey Gold

S - T
Sabrina: The Animated Series ("Sabrina (She'll Bewitch Ya)") - B*Witched
Sabrina's Secret Life ("Who's Makin' Magic?") - Jean-Michel Guirao 
Sailor Moon ("Moonlight Densetsu") - DALI (seasons 1 and 2), Moon Lips (seasons 3 and 4); composed by Tetsuya Komoro
The Saint - Edwin Astley (B/W episodes); Edwin Astley, Leslie Charteris (color episodes)
Sam & Cat ("Just Fine") - Michael Corcoran
Samurai Jack - Black Eyed Peas
The Sandy Duncan Show ("The Kind of Girl She Is") - Alan and Marilyn Bergman
Sanford and Son ("The Streetbeater") - Quincy Jones
Saturday Night Live - Howard Shore
Saved by the Bell - Scott Gale
Scarecrow and Mrs. King - Arthur B. Rubinstein
School of Rock! ("Are You Ready to Rock?") - School of Rock
SciGirls - Steve D'Angelo, Terry Tompkins and Jeff Morrow for Eggplant
Scooby-Doo, Where Are You! - David Mook and Ben Raleigh (performed first season by Larry Markes; second season by Austin Roberts)
Scrubs ("Superman") - Lazlo Bane (seasons 1–8), WAZ (season 9)
Sea Hunt - David Rose (as "Ray Llewellyn")
The Second Hundred Years - George Duning
Seinfeld - Jonathan Wolff
The Sentimental Agent - Ivor Slaney
Sesame Street ("Can You Tell Me How to Get to Sesame Street?") - Joe Raposo, Jon Stone, and Bruce Hart; performed by The Kids
Sex and the City - Douglas J. Cuomo and Tom Findlay
Shaft ("Theme from Shaft") - Isaac Hayes
Shake It Up - Selena Gomez
Shameless ("The Luck You Got") - The High Strung
Sherlock - David Arnold and Michael Price
Sherlock Holmes (1984 TV Series) - Patrick Gowers 
Sheriff Callie's Wild West - Mandy Moore
Shimmer and Shine - Melanie Fontana; composed by Joachim Svare and Joleen Belle
Shining Time Station - Kevin Roth
Sigmund and the Sea Monsters ("Friends") - Johnny Whitaker
Sihina Wasanthayak (Sirasa TV) ("Sansara Purudada Mey") - Dinesh Subasinghe
Silver Spoons ("Together") - Rik Howard and Bob Wirth
Simon & Simon - Barry De Vorzon and Michael Towers
The Simpsons ("The Simpsons Theme") - Danny Elfman
Sir Francis Drake - Ivor Slaney
Sister Kate ("Maybe an Angel") - Amy Grant
Six Feet Under - Thomas Newman
The Six Million Dollar Man - Oliver Nelson
Small Wonder ("She's a Small Wonder") - Ron Alexander, Howard Leeds and Diane Leslie
Smallville ("Save Me") - Remy Zero
The Smothers Brothers Comedy Hour ("The Brothers Theme") - Mason Williams and Nancy Ames
Snoops ("Curiosity") - Ray Charles
Snoops (1999)  ("One Way or Another") - Blondie
So Random! - Brandon Mychal Smith
So Weird ("In the Darkness") - Mackenzie Phillips
Soap - George Tipton
Sofia the First - Ariel Winter
Solid Gold - Theme song performed by Dionne Warwick (Seasons 1 and 4) and Marilyn McCoo (Seasons 2–3, 5–8)
Some Mothers Do 'Ave Em - Ronnie Hazlehurst
The Sonny & Cher Comedy Hour ("The Beat Goes On") - Sonny Bono and Cher
Sonny with a Chance ("So Far, So Great") - Demi Lovato
The Sooty Show - Alan Braden
The Sopranos (Woke Up This Morning") - Alabama 3
Sorry! - Gaynor Colbourn and Hugh Wisdom
Soul Train ("TSOP (The Sound of Philadelphia)") - MFSB and The Three Degrees
South of Sunset ("Call on Me") - Glenn Frey
South Park - Primus
Space: 1999 - Barry Gray (Series One), Derek Wadsworth (Series Two)
Spartacus - Joseph LoDuca
Special Agent Oso - Joseph Gian
Spenser: for Hire - Steve Dorff and Larry Herbstritt
Spider-Man ("Your Friendly Neighborhood Spider-Man") - Paul Francis Webster and J. Robert Harris
SpongeBob SquarePants - Patrick Pinney
SportsCenter - Annie Roboff
Square Pegs - The Waitresses
St. Elsewhere - Dave Grusin
Stagecoach West - Bud & Travis
Stanley - Baha Men
Star Cops ("It Won't be Easy") - Justin Hayward
Star Trek ("Theme from Star Trek") - Alexander Courage
Star Trek: Deep Space Nine - Dennis McCarthy
Star Trek: Enterprise ("Faith of the Heart") - performed by Rod Stewart / ("Archer's Theme") - Ending piece by Dennis McCarthy
Star Trek: The Next Generation - Jerry Goldsmith, Alexander Courage; arrangement by Dennis McCarthy
Star Trek: Voyager - Jerry Goldsmith
Star vs. the Forces of Evil ("I'm from Another Dimension") - Brad Breeck
Stargate Atlantis - Joel Goldsmith
Stargate SG-1 - Joel Goldsmith
Stargate Universe - Joel Goldsmith
Starsky & Hutch - 
Star Wars: Forces of Destiny - Ryan Shore
Stay Lucky - John Powell, performed by Dennis Waterman
Step by Step - Jesse Frederick and Teresa James
Steptoe and Son ("Old Ned") - Ron Grainer
Steven Universe 
Still Open All Hours - Max Harris, based on "Alice, Where Art Thou?", written by Joseph Ascher
Still Standing ("You Make Me Happy") - Will Hoge
Stingray (1964) ("Aqua Marina") - Gary Miller
Stingray - Mike Post
The Stockard Channing Show ("Stockard's Theme") - Delaney Bramlett
Strange Report - Roger Webb
The Strange World of Gurney Slade - Max Harris
Street Hawk ("Le Parc") - Tangerine Dream
Street Justice - Lawrence Shragge
The Streets of San Francisco - Patrick Williams
Stuck in the Middle ("Stuck with You") - Sonos
Suburgatory ("Pleasant Nightmare") - Alih Jey
Suddenly Susan ("Nothing on Me") - Shawn Colvin
Sue Thomas: F.B.Eye ("Who I Am") - Jessica Andrews
Sugar and Spice - Leslie Pearl, Paul Solovay and Susan Spiegel Solovay
Sugar Time! ("Girls, Girls, Girls") - Barbi Benton
The Suite Life of Zack & Cody ("Here I Am") - Loren Ellis and the Drew Davis Band
The Suite Life on Deck ("Livin' the Suite Life") - Steve Rushton
Sunday Dinner ("Love Begins at Home") - Kim Carnes
Super Fun Night ("Don't Stop Me Now") - written by Freddie Mercury; performed by the cast
Super Mario World - Mark Mothersbaugh
Super Robot Monkey Team Hyperforce Go! - Polysics
Superjail! ("Commin' Home") - Cheeseburger; ("Rubber Bullets") - 10cc (pilot episode)
Supernatural - Jay Gruska
Superstore - Mateo Messina
Super Why! - ("Who's Got the Power?") - Eggplant, LLC
Surfside 6 - Mack David and Jerry Livingston
Survivor ("Ancient Voices") - Russ Landau
S.W.A.T. ("Theme from S.W.A.T.") - Rhythm Heritage (composed by Barry De Vorzon)
Sweet Valley High - Shuki Levy, Haim Saban and Yuval Ron
Switch - Glen A. Larson
Sydney ("Finish What Ya Started") - Van Halen
Sydney to the Max ("Stay the Same") - Ruth Righi and Dan Conklin
Sykes - Ken Jones
Tabitha ("It Could Be Magic") - Lisa Hartman Black
Taggart ("No Mean City") - Maggie Bell
Taina ("Gonna Be a Star") - Christina Vidal
TaleSpin ("Spin It!") - Michael and Patty Silversher
Tales From The Crypt - Danny Elfman
The Tall Man - Juan García Esquivel
Tammy - Jay Livingston and Ray Evans
The Tammy Grimes Show - John Williams
Tarzán - Laurence Juber (1991–92); Robert O. Ragland (1992-94)
Taxi ("Angela") - Bob James
Team Umizoomi - PT Walkley
Teech ("Teach Me") - B.B. King
Teen Titans - Puffy AmiYumi
Teen Titans Go! ("Teen Titans Theme (Mix Master Mike Remix)") - Puffy AmiYumi
Teenage Mutant Ninja Turtles - Chuck Lorre and Dennis C. Brown
Teenage Mutant Ninja Turtles (2012) - Sebastian Evans
TekWar ("Real or Not") Warren Zevon; composed by Fred Mollin
Teletubbies ("Teletubbies say "Eh-oh!"") - Andrew McCrorie-Shand 
Test Match Special ("Soul Limbo") - Booker T. & the M.G.'s
The Texas Wheelers ("Illegal Smile") - John Prine
That '70s Show ("In the Street") - Cheap Trick
That Girl - Earle Hagen and Sam Denoff
That's My Bush! - DVDA
That's My Mama - Lamont Dozier
That's So Raven - Raven-Symoné, Orlando Brown and Anneliese van der Pol
That's Your Funeral - Ronnie Hazlehurst
T.H.E. Cat - Lalo Schifrin
Then Churchill Said to Me - Ronnie Hazlehurst, performed by Anne Shelton 
The Thin Blue Line - Howard Goodall
Third Watch ("Keep Hope Alive") - The Crystal Method
This Week in Baseball:
 Opening theme: "Jet Set" – Mike Vickers (previously used for the 1974–75 version of Jackpot) 
 Closing theme: "Gathering Crowds" – John Scott
Thomas & Friends - Mike O'Donnell
Three Wishes ("Believe") - Amy Grant
Three's a Crowd ("Side by Side") - music by Michael Lloyd; lyrics by Al Kasha, Joel Hirschhorn, Don Nicholl & Michael Lloyd
Three's Company ("Come and Knock on Our Door") - written by Joe Raposo and Don Nicholl; performed by Ray Charles and Julia Rinker
Three Up, Two Down - Ronnie Hazlehurst
The Thrills ("Extraordinary") - Mandy Moore
Throb - Diana Canova and The Nylons
The Thundermans ("Livin' a Double Life") - Kira Kosarin and Jack Griffo
Till Death Do Us Part - Dennis Wilson
Time of Your Life ("I've Just Seen a Face") - BoDeans
The Time Tunnel - John Williams
Timon & Pumbaa ("Hakuna Matata") - music by Elton John; lyrics by Tim Rice
T. J. Hooker - Mark Snow
To the Manor Born - Ronnie Hazlehurst
The Tomorrow People - Dudley Simpson
The Tonight Show Starring Johnny Carson ("Johnny's Theme") - Paul Anka
Too Close for Comfort - Johnny Mandel
Top Gear ("Jessica") - The Allman Brothers Band
Top of the Heap ("Puttin' On the Ritz") - Kenny Yarbrough
Torchwood - Murray Gold
The Torkelsons ("A New Day Promises") - The Judds
Touch - Lisa Coleman and Wendy Melvoin
Touched by an Angel ("I'll Walk With You") - performed by Della Reese
Tour of Duty ("Paint It Black") - The Rolling Stones
Tracey Takes On... ("They Don't Know About Us") - Kirsty MacColl
The Tracey Ullman Show ("You're Thinking Right") - performed and composed by George Clinton
Trapper John, M.D. - John Carl Parker
The Travels of Jaimie McPheeters - Leigh Harline and Jerry Winn
The Trials of O'Brien - Sid Ramin
The Trials of Rosie O'Neill ("I Wish I Knew") - Melissa Manchester
Tripping the Rift - Mario Sévigny
Trollz ("It's a Hair Thing") - Haim
Tru Calling ("Somebody Help Me") - Full Blown Rose
True Blood ("Bad Things") - Jace Everett
True Jackson, VP ("Change It Up") - Keke Palmer
Tweenies - ("Hey, Hey, Are You Ready to Play?") - Liz Kitchen, Graham Pike and Barrie Bignold
The Two Ronnies - Ronnie Hazlehurst
The Twilight Zone - Bernard Herrmann (Season 1); Marius Constant (Seasons 2–5)
Twin Peaks ("Falling") - Angelo Badalamenti
Two and a Half Men ("Manly Men") - Lee Aronsohn, Grant Geissman, and Chuck Lorre;

U - Z
The Ugliest Girl in Town - Howard Greenfield and Helen Miller; (sung by Will-O-Bees)
Uncle Buck - Ronnie Milsap
Under Cover - Cameron Allan
University Challenge ("College Boy") - Derek New
Unsusb - Mike Post
Up Pompeii! - Alan Braden
Upstairs, Downstairs - Alexander Faris
Ugly Betty - Jeff Beal
Underdog - W. Watts Biggers, Chet Stover, Joe Harris, Treadwell Covington
V: The Series - Dennis McCarthy
V ("Uprising") - Muse
Veronica Mars ("We Used To Be Friends") - The Dandy Warhols
Veronica's Closet ("She's Got Everything") - Jeffrey Osborne (seasons 1 & 2); ("Bodyrock") - Moby
VeggieTales - Mike Nawrocki, Phil Vischer, Lisa Vischer and Kurt Heinecke
The Vicar of Dibley - Howard Goodall, adaption of Psalm 23, performed by the choir of Christ Church Cathedral, Oxford
Victorious ("Make It Shine") - Victoria Justice
Vikings ("If I Had A Heart") - Karin Dreijer
V.I.P. - Frankie Blue
The Virginian ("Lonesome Tree") - Percy Faith (seasons 1–8) and Ennio Morricone (season 9)
Voyage to the Bottom of the Sea ("The Seaview Theme") - Paul Sawtell
W5 (during the 1970s and 1980s) ("Fool's Overture") - Supertramp
The Wackiest Ship in the Army - Howard Greenfield, Jack Keller and Helen Miller
Wagon Train - Jerome Moross
Walker, Texas Ranger ("Eyes of the Ranger") - Chuck Norris
The Walking Dead - Bear McCreary
Wall Street Week ("TWX in 12 Bars") - Donald Swartz
Walt Disney anthology television series - Richard M. Sherman and Robert B. Sherman
The Waltons - Jerry Goldsmith
Watching ("What Does He See in Me?") - written by Charles Hart, performed by Emma Wray
Watership Down ("Bright Eyes") - Art Garfunkel
Wayside ("Fly by the Wayside") - Skye Sweetnam
We Bare Bears ("We'll Be There") - Estelle
Webster ("Then Came You") - Steve Nelson and Gail Loparta
Weeds ("Little Boxes") - Malvina Reynolds
Weekend World ("Nantucket Sleighride")
Weird Science - Oingo Boingo
Welcome Back, Kotter ("Welcome Back") - John Sebastian
Welcome to the Wayne - Anna Waronker and Charlotte Caffey
Wendy and Me ("Wendy") - Ervin Drake
The West Wing - W. G. Snuffy Walden
What a Country! ("I Want to Be an American") - Dick DeBenedictis
Whatever Happened to the Likely Lads? - Mike Hugg and Ian La Frenais
Whatever Happened to... Robot Jones? - The Invisible Car
What's Happening!! - Henry Mancini
What's New, Scooby-Doo? - Simple Plan
Wheel Of Fortune ("Changing Keys") - Merv Griffin
When Things Were Rotten - Lee Adams and Charles Strouse
Where in the World Is Carmen Sandiego? - Rockapella
Where in Time Is Carmen Sandiego? - The Engine Crew
Whiplash ("Whiplash") - Words and Music by Edwin Astley; sung by Frank Ifield
Whirlybirds - William Loose and John Seely
The White Shadow - Mike Post and Pete Carpenter
Who Wants to Be a Millionaire - Keith Strachan and Matthew Strachan
Who's the Boss? ("Brand New Life") - Larry Carlton and Robert Kraft; 
Who's Watching the Kids? - Charles Bernstein
Whoops Apocalypse - Nigel Hess
Wide World of Sports - Charles Fox
Wild Kratts ("Gonna Go Wild Kratts") - Sterling Jarvis
Wild West C.O.W.-Boys of Moo Mesa - Billy Dean and Verlon Thompson 
The Wild Wild West - Richard Markowitz
Will & Grace - Jonathan Wolff
Wings ("Piano Sonata No. 20 in A Major, D. 959, Rondo: Allegretto") - Franz Schubert
WIOU - Gary Chang
The Wire 
Wiseguy - Mike Post
The Wizard of Odds - Alan Thicke
Wizards of Waverly Place ("Everything Is Not What It Seems") - Selena Gomez
WKRP in Cincinnati - Steve Carlisle
Wolf - Artie Kane
Wolfblood ("A Promise That I Keep") - Lisa Knapp (series 1–3), ("Running with the Wolves") - Aurora (series 4-present)
Wonder Woman - Charles Fox and Norman Gimbel
The Wonder Pets! - Jeffrey Lesser
The Wonder Years ("With a Little Help from My Friends") - John Lennon and Paul McCartney; performed by Joe Cocker
Wonderbug - Jimmie Haskell
WordGirl - ("Word Up, It's WordGirl!") - Steve D'Angelo and Terry Tompkins
WordWorld - Billy Straus
Working Girl ("Let the River Run") - Carly Simon
Working It Out - John Loeffler and Ralph Schuckett
The World at War - Carl Davis
The Worst Witch (1998 TV Series) - Paul K. Joyce
The Worst Witch (2017 TV Series) - Mark Russell
WWE Main Event ("On My Own") - CFO$
WWE NXT ("Welcome Home") - Coheed and Cambria
WWE Raw ("Legendary") - Skillet
WWE Saturday Morning Slam ("The Time is Mine") - Jim Johnston
WWE SmackDown ("Are You Ready") - AC/DC
WWE Tough Enough ("Champion") - Chipmunk ft. Chris Brown
Wow! Wow! Wubbzy! - Brad Mossman
The X-Files ("Materia Primoris") Mark Snow
Xena: Warrior Princess - Joseph LoDuca
Xuxa ("Xuxa's Theme (O Xou da Xuxa Começou)" aka "Hello, Hello, Hello!") - Xuxa
Yancy Derringer - Don Quinn and Henry Russell
A Year at the Top - Howard Greenfield and Paul Shaffer
The Yellow Rose ("The Yellow Rose of Texas") - Johnny Lee and Lane Brody
Yes, Dear ("Family is Family") - performed and written by Bill Janovitz
Yes Minister - Ronnie Hazlehurst
Yin Yang Yo! - Kyle Massey
You Can't Do That on Television (Dixieland Jazz version of "William Tell Overture") - The National Press Club and Allied Workers Jazz Band
You Don't Say! (original NBC version, 1963–69) - Rex Koury
You Rang M'Lord? - Jimmy Perry and Roy Moore, performed by Bob Monkhouse and Paul Shane
You Take the Kids - Jeff Moss (performed by Nell Carter
Young Americans ("Six Pacs") - The Getaway People
The Young and the Restless ("Nadia's Theme") - Barry De Vorzon and Perry Botkin Jr.
Young Dan'l Boone - Earle Hagen
Young Maverick - David Buttolph
The Young Ones - Sid Tepper and Roy C. Bennett
The Young Rebels - Dominic Frontiere
Young Sheldon ("Mighty Little Man") - Steve Burns
Z-Cars - Fritz Spiegl and Bridget Fry, adapted from the traditional Liverpool folk song "Johnny Todd"
Zig and Zag ("Zig and Zag") - Ricky Wilson and Simon Rix
Zoboomafoo ("Me and You and Zoboomafoo") - Kratt brothers
Zoey 101 ("Follow Me") - Jamie Lynn Spears
Zoobilee Zoo ("Zoobilee Zoo") - Shuki Levy and Haim Saban
The Zoo Gang - Paul and Linda McCartney and performed by Paul McCartney and Wings
Zorro - George Bruns and Norman Foster

See also
List of television theme music composers

External links
 ClassicThemes.com
 TV Theme Tunes A directory of TV theme tunes.
 Television Tunes The largest database of TV theme songs.
 Wave Themes Home Page

OTHERS FOR YOUR CONSIDERATION (vERIFICATION REQUESTED, PLEASE; THANKS VERY MUCH!  TAKE CARE!)

20th Century, The; (1960’s Documentary, narrated by Walter Cronkite)::
21st Century, The; successor to the 20th Century; (1960’s Documentary, narrated by Walter Cronkite)::
Adventures of Brisco County, Jr, The; (Starring Bruce Campbell)::
Amy Prentiss (NBC Mystery Movie starring Jessica Walter)::
Apple’s Way (1970’s; family drama)::
A-Team, The (1980's action adventure starring George Peppard & Mr. T)::
Banacek (NBC Mystery Movie starring George Peppard)::
Cannon (1971 Detective series starring William Conrad)::
Circle of Fear (1972 thriller)::
Cleopatra 2525 (1994 Action Pack)::
Columbo (NBC Mystery Movie starring Peter Falk)::
Cool Million (NBC Mystery Movie)::
Davey & Goliath (1960’s Claymation)::
Double Life of Henry Phyfe, The (1966 starring Red Buttons)::
Dr. Who (BBC; 1960's through current)::
Eight is Enough (1970's starring Dick Van Patten)::
Elementary (2010's; Sherlock Holmes remake)::
Family Holvak, The (1970’s family drama starring Glenn Ford)::
Faraday & Co. (NBC Mystery Movie)::
Fury (1950's starring Peter Graves)::
Getting Together (1971, starring Bobby Sherman)::
Gumby (1960’s Claymation)::
Guns of Will Sonnett, the (1960’s starring Walter Brennan)::
H.R. Pufnstuf (Sid & Marty Kroft, starring Jack Wild)::
Harveytoons Show, The (1950’s Animated)::
Hec Ramsey (NBC Mystery Movie)::
Heckle & Jeckle, the Talking Magpies (1950’s Animated)::
Hercules: The Legendary Journeys (1994 Action Pack)::
Jack of All Trades::
James at 16 (continuation of James at 15, which is listed)::
Kung Fu (NBC Mystery Movie)::
Lannigan’s Rabbi (NBC Mystery Movie)::
Lidsville (Sid & Marty Kroft, starring Butch Patrick)::
Madigan (NBC Mystery Movie)::
Matt Helm (1970’s detective starring Anthony Franciosa)::
Matt Houston (1980's detective starring Lee Horsley)::
McCloud (NBC Mystery Movie starring Dennis Weaver)::
McCoy (NBC Mystery Movie)::
McMillan & Wife (NBC Mystery Movie starring Rock Hudson & Susan Saint James)::
Mighty Mouse (1950’s Animated)::
My Friend Flicka (1940’s series starring Gene Evans & Anita Louise)::
NOTE:  I believe the actual title of what is listed here as Disney Anthology, is actually ‘Walt Disney’s Wonderful World of Color’::
Real McCoys, The (1950’s starring Walter Brennan)::
Red Buttons variety series, 1952 – 1955::
Ruff & Ready (1950’s Animated)::
Second Hundred Years, The (1960’s, Starring Monte Markham)::
Sixth Sense, The (1970’s Sci-Fi starring Gary Collins)::
Sliders (Sci-Fi starring Jerry O’Connell & John Rhys-Davies)::
Snoop Sisters, The (NBC Mystery Movie)::
Starlost, The (1970's BBC)::
Tarzan (1960’s series starring Ron Ely)::
TekWar (1994 Action Pack; books by William Shatner)::
Tenafly (NBC Mystery Movie)::
Then Came Bronson (1960’s, starring Michael Parks)::
Three for the Road (1970's starring Alex Rocco, Vincent Van Patten)::
Tomorrow People, The (BBC; 1970’s original)::
Tomorrow People, The (BBC; 1990’s remake)::
Waltons, The (1970’s, starring Ralph Waite, Michael Learned, Richard Thomas)::
Xena: Warrior Princess (1994 Action Pack)::

 
TV theme music